Hermann Eris Busse (9 March 1891, Freiburg im Breisgau – 15 August 1947) was a German novelist and literary critic. He is best known for his Black Forest novels and his biography of the 17th-century German writer Hans Jakob Christoph von Grimmelshausen.

Major works 
 Bauernadel (trilogy of novels), 1930. 	
 Der Letzte Bauer (novel), 1930.
Mein Leben (autobiography), 1935.
Grimmelshausen, 1939.
Glorian und die Frevlerin (stories), 1944.

1891 births
1947 deaths
Writers from Freiburg im Breisgau
People from the Grand Duchy of Baden
German literary critics
Writers from Baden-Württemberg
German male novelists
20th-century German novelists
20th-century German male writers
German male non-fiction writers